Roadkill is the first full-length studio album by Israeli punk band Kill the Drive, released on December 6, 2006.

It is the band's only album with guitarist Lavy Josephson who left the band in 2007, though he also appeared on the band's earlier demo Short Notice, which was released in February 2006.

Track listing

Personnel
Eyal Reiner - lead vocals, bass
Lavy Josephson - guitar, backing vocals
Gideon Berger - drums, percussion

References

2006 albums
Kill the Drive albums